Grass Township is one of nine townships in Spencer County, Indiana. As of the 2010 census, its population was 1,241 and it contained 556 housing units.  Grass Township contains the city of Chrisney.

History
Grass Township was founded about 1816, and named for Daniel Grass. Daniel Grass was one of the first pioneer settlers in the area.

Geography

Cities and towns
Chrisney

Unincorporated towns
Bloomfield
Centerville
Midway

References

External links
 Indiana Township Association
 United Township Association of Indiana

Townships in Spencer County, Indiana
Townships in Indiana